Estonian Technical and Sport Union (abbreviation ETSU) is an Estonian organization, which deals with technics-related sports.

ETSU is established on 25 June 1990.

ETSU is an umbrella organization for seven sub-organizations:
 Eesti Automudelispordi Klubi (member of EOC)
 Eesti Laevamodellistide Liit (member of EOC)
 Estonian Radio Amateurs' Union (member of EOC)
 Noorte Spordi- ja Tehnikaklubi Master
 Ida-Virumaa Automudelispordi Klubi
 MTÜ Sindi Mudelisport
 MTÜ Mudelihall

References

External links
 

Science and technology in Estonia
Motorsport in Estonia